Head (vessel) Evidence for carbonates on Mars was first discovered in 2008. Previously, most remote sensing instruments such as OMEGA and THEMIS—sensitive to infrared emissivity spectral features of carbonates—had not suggested the presence of carbonate outcrops, at least at the 100 m or coarser spatial scales available from the returned data.

Though ubiquitous, a 2003 study of carbonates on Mars showed that they are dominated by Magnesite (MgCO3) in Martian dust, had mass fractions less than 5%, and could have formed under current atmospheric conditions. Furthermore, with the exception of the surface dust component, by 2007 carbonates had not been detected by any in situ mission, even though mineralogic modeling did not preclude small amounts of calcium carbonate in Independence class rocks of Husband Hill in Gusev crater (note: An IAU naming convention within Gusev is not yet established).

Remote sensing data 

The first successful identification of a strong infrared spectral signature from surficial carbonate minerals of local scale (< 10 km²) was made by the MRO-CRISM team. Spectral modeling in 2007 identified a key deposit in Nili Fossae dominated by a single mineral phase that was spatially associated with olivine outcrops. The dominant mineral appeared to be magnesite, while morphology inferred with HiRISE and thermal properties suggested that the deposit was lithic. Stratigraphically, this layer appeared between phyllosilicates below and mafic cap rocks above, temporally between the Noachian and Hesperian eras. Even though infrared spectra are representative of minerals to less than ≈0.1 mm depths (in contrast to gamma spectra which are sensitive to tens of cm depths), stratigraphic, morphologic, and thermal properties are consistent with the existence of the carbonate as outcrop rather than alteration rinds. Nevertheless, the morphology was distinct from typical terrestrial sedimentary carbonate layers suggesting formation from local aqueous alteration of olivine and other igneous minerals. However, key implications were that the alteration would have occurred under moderate pH and that the resulting carbonates were not exposed to sustained low pH aqueous conditions even as recently as the Hesperian. This increased the likelihood of local and regional scale geologic conditions on Mars that were favorable to analogs of terrestrial biological activity over geologically significant intervals.

, the absence of more extensive carbonate deposits on Mars was thought by some scientists to be due to global dominance of low pH aqueous environments.
Even the least soluble carbonate, siderite (FeCO3), precipitates only at a pH greater than 5.

Evidence for significant quantities of carbonate deposits on the surface began to increase in 2008 when the Thermal and Evolved Gas Analyzer (TEGA) and WCL experiments on the 2007 Phoenix Mars lander found between 3–5wt% calcite (CaCO3) and an alkaline soil. In 2010 analyses by the Mars Exploration Rover Spirit, identified outcrops rich in magnesium-iron carbonate (16–34 wt%) in the Columbia Hills of Gusev crater, most likely precipitated from carbonate-bearing solutions under hydrothermal conditions at near-neutral pH in association with volcanic activity during the Noachian era.

After Spirit Rover stopped working scientists studied old data from the Miniature Thermal Emission Spectrometer, or Mini-TES and confirmed the presence of large amounts of carbonate-rich rocks, which means that regions of the planet may have once harbored water. The carbonates were discovered in an outcrop of rocks called "Comanche."

Carbonates (calcium or iron carbonates) were discovered in a crater on the rim of Huygens Crater, located in the Iapygia quadrangle. The impact on the rim exposed material that had been dug up from the impact that created Huygens. These minerals represent evidence that Mars once had a thicker carbon dioxide atmosphere with abundant moisture. These kind of carbonates only form when there is a lot of water. They were found with the Compact Reconnaissance Imaging Spectrometer for Mars (CRISM) instrument on the Mars Reconnaissance Orbiter. Earlier, the instrument had detected clay minerals. The carbonates were found near the clay minerals. Both of these minerals form in wet environments. It is supposed that billions of years age Mars was much warmer and wetter. At that time, carbonates would have formed from water and the carbon dioxide-rich atmosphere. Later the deposits of carbonate would have been buried. The double impact has now exposed the minerals. Earth has vast carbonate deposits in the form of limestone.

Gallery

See also

 Areography (geography of Mars)
 
 Chloride-bearing deposits on Mars
 Composition of Mars
 Elysium Planitia
 Fretted terrain
 Geology of Mars
 Glaciers on Mars
 Gravity of Mars
 Groundwater on Mars
 Hecates Tholus
 Iapygia quadrangle
 Lakes on Mars
 Life on Mars
 List of quadrangles on Mars
 List of rocks on Mars
 Magnetic field of Mars
 Mars Geyser Hopper
 Martian craters
 Martian dichotomy
 Martian geyser
 Martian gullies
 Martian soil
 Mineralogy of Mars
 Ore resources on Mars
 Scientific information from the Mars Exploration Rover mission
 Seasonal flows on warm Martian slopes
 Vallis
 Water on Mars

References

Rocks on Mars